RATP Smart Systems, is a company specializing in ticketing and passenger information systems. The company provides these with focus on new technology such as mobile phones, smartcards and the Internet. It is a subsidiary of RATP Group.

History
The company was founded in February 2010 as part of an initiative to promote the RATP Group's activities outside of Paris.

Expertise

Passenger information 
Public transport users are demanding an ever improving, increasingly individualised travel experience.
They want responsive, innovative services to make their journey easier. Nowadays, passenger expectations are to
 Get information to prepare and optimise their journey
 Look up traffic conditions in real time
 Be warned of incidents and be given alternative solutions

Ticketing services 
Ticketing covers all activities involved in ticket sales, validation and inspection (as well as fare collection and control). It lies at the heart of public transport systems and our role is to implement simple solutions that can evolve continuously in a complex environment.

Locations 
RATP Smart Systems refers to a presence in 10 countries and lists reference projets in 11 countries: Algeria, Saudi Arabia, Colombia, France, Chile, United Kingdom, Ivory Coast, Ecuador, India, Mexico and the Dominican Republic.

References

External links

Companies based in Paris
French companies established in 2010
Fare collection systems in France
RATP Group
Technology companies established in 2010